Crataraea is a genus of rove beetles in the family Staphylinidae. There is at least one described species in Crataraea, C. suturalis.

There is potentially a second species in this genus, Crataraea grandiceps, a preserved specimen at the Smithsonian National Museum of Natural History.

References

Further reading

External links

 

Aleocharinae